Camera Obscura was a new wave/synthpop band formed in 1982 in York, England, by Peter Oldroyd and Nigel James. They signed to Small Wonder Records in 1983 and reached no. 32 on the UK Indie Chart with the single "Destitution". In 1986 the band split, reformed for a tour of Germany in 2005 after signing to German label Anna Logue Records. They have since released an album of recordings from 1983, Horizons of Suburbia, two singles "Strange Faces", "Strange Faces 2006" and a live EP from a show in Hannover, Germany.

Discography

Albums
Horizons of Suburbia (2005) Anna Logue
Live in Hannover (8-10-2005) (2007) Anna Logue (with "Strange Faces 2006" 7-inch single)

Singles
"Destitution" (1983) Small Wonder
"Village of Stars" (1983) (unreleased)
"Strange Faces" (2006) Anna Logue

References

External links
Anna Logue Records
Camera Obscura at Last.fm
Camera Obscura at discogs.com

English new wave musical groups
English pop music duos
Musical groups established in 1982
Musical groups disestablished in 1986
Musical groups reestablished in 2005
1982 establishments in England